Nei til EU is the main Norwegian interest group opposing a future Norwegian accession to the European Union (EU). It began informally in 1988 and became a full organization in 1990.

Criticism

While presenting itself as politically neutral, the organisation has been accused of largely being a leftist organisation consisting mostly of Socialist Left Party and Centre Party members. In addition, the organisation has also been noted for rejecting, as well as being rejected by, eurosceptic Progress Party members.

Leadership

 President and spokesperson: Roy Pedersen  
 Secretary General: Kjell Arnestad 
 Vice President: Einar Frogner 
 Vice President: Heidi Larsen
 Member of the leadership group: Sofie Axelsen Osland

References

Organisations based in Norway
Organizations established in 1990